

Season summary
After 5 seasons in Serie A, Brescia were relegated.

Kit
Italian company Kappa became Brescia's kit manufacturers. Banca Lombarda remained sponsors.

Players
Squad at end of season

Left club during season

Competitions

Serie A

References

Notes

Brescia Calcio seasons
Brescia